Women at the World's Crossroads is a 1922 book by English women's rights activist and preacher Maude Royden.

Summary
The book collects Royden's speeches that were made at the prior National Convention of the Young Women's Christian Association. The chapter "Woman's Service to Theology" focuses on women having the right to be ministers based on there being "no authority to be derived from Christ" and Jesus showing himself to men as well as women. The book's final speech is about Royden's belief that love is the only power of creativity.

Reception
The Shamokin News-Dispatch published a 1923 report from YWCA USA that says the book had "widespread demand". The president of YWCA at the time, Mabel Marshall, held a toast to the book. The publisher Woman's Press said in 1923 that the book's demand was "unprecedented" and that a holiday edition on Japanese paper would be published. Mary O. Cowper said in the journal Social Forces that as Royden "writes or speaks she seems not to be visionary or sentimental, but practical, sensible, convincing, and inspiring".

References

1922 non-fiction books
Books about women
Christianity and women